Münstermann is a surname of German origin.

Notable persons having this surname include:

Carl von Münstermann (1843–1930), professor of culture and technology at the Agricultural University of Berlin
Hans Münstermann, (born 1947), Dutch novelist
Henricus Münstermann  (died 1537),  Catholic priest and abbot of Marienfeld
Julia Münstermann, German artist
Lasse Münstermann (born 1979), German snooker player
Ludwig Münstermann (1560 or 1575–1638/1639), German sculptor
Paul Münstermann (1932–2010), former Vice President of the Federal Intelligence Service (Bundesnachrichtendienst)
Peter Münstermann (born 1956), German politician (SPD)
Willi Münstermann (1903–1982), German entrepreneur, sponsor of the Krefeld Penguins 

German-language surnames